María Rivera (born 16 June 1967) is a Mexican former swimmer. She competed in two events at the 1988 Summer Olympics.

References

External links
 

1967 births
Living people
Mexican female swimmers
Olympic swimmers of Mexico
Swimmers at the 1988 Summer Olympics
Sportspeople from Saltillo
Central American and Caribbean Games gold medalists for Mexico
Central American and Caribbean Games medalists in swimming
Competitors at the 1990 Central American and Caribbean Games
Pan American Games bronze medalists for Mexico
Swimmers at the 1991 Pan American Games
Medalists at the 1991 Pan American Games
Pan American Games medalists in swimming
20th-century Mexican women
21st-century Mexican women